A list of notable Estonian poets:

A
Kai Aareleid
Johannes Aavik
Hendrik Adamson 
Artur Adson 
Vahur Afanasjev 
Eda Ahi
Ave Alavainu 
Andres Allan
August Alle
Artur Alliksaar 
Betti Alver 
Ott Arder

B
Johannes Barbarus
Vladimir Beekman 
Priidu Beier 
Veiko Belials 
Mihkel Bravat

E
Andres Ehin 
Kristiina Ehin 
Salme Ekbaum
Ernst Enno

G
Villem Grünthal-Ridala

H
Paul Haavaoks 
Lehte Hainsalu
Aime Hansen
Viiu Härm
Marie Heiberg
Mehis Heinsaar
Erni Hiir
Indrek Hirv

I
Aapo Ilves
Jaan Isotamm
Ivar Ivask

J
Merle Jääger (pen name Merca)
Carl Robert Jakobson
Peeter Jakobson 
Jaak Jõerüüt
Ottniell Jürissaar

K
Bernard Kangro 
Maarja Kangro 
Jaan Kaplinski 
Doris Kareva
Jaan Kärner 
Kalev Kesküla
Sven Kivisildnik 
Lydia Koidula 
Ilmi Kolla
Friedrich Reinhold Kreutzwald 
Jaan Kross 
Erni Krusten
Asko Künnap

L
Ilmar Laaban 
Uno Laht 
Leonhard Lapin 
Eha Lättemäe
Kalju Lepik 
Juhan Liiv 
Martin Lipp
Viivi Luik

M
Uku Masing 
Kersti Merilaas 
Arvo Mets 
Ene Mihkelson 
Mikk Murdvee
Kalle Muuli

N
Ellen Niit
Minni Nurme

O
Sulev Oll 
Tõnu Õnnepalu

P

Jaan Pehk 
Kristjan Jaak Peterson

R
Alexis Rannit 
Eno Raud
Mart Raud 
Karl Ristikivi 
Jürgen Rooste 
Andrus Rõuk 
Paul-Eerik Rummo

S
August Sang 
Johannes Semper 
Karl Martin Sinijärv 
Juhan Smuul 
Lauri Sommer
Eric Stenbock 
Gustav Suits
Juhan Sütiste

T
Jüri Talvet 
Heiti Talvik 
Tarmo Teder 
Tiia Toomet
Mats Traat 
Tõnu Trubetsky
Leelo Tungal
Ülo Tuulik

U
Kauksi Ülle
Marie Under 
Jaak Urmet

V
Debora Vaarandi
Kätlin Vainola
Aidi Vallik
Arvo Valton
Johannes Vares 
Mihkel Veske 
Enn Vetemaa
Elo Viiding 
Juhan Viiding 
Paul Viiding 
Heiki Vilep 
Henrik Visnapuu
Peeter Volkonski

W
Wimberg

 List of Estonian poets
Estonian
Poets